

Events 
 Approximate formation date of the Florentine Camerata, at the salon of Count Giovanni de' Bardi (earliest record is January 14, 1573).
Manuel Rodrigues Coelho becomes organist of Badajoz Cathedral.

Publications 

 Giammateo Asola –  for six voices (Venice: Girolamo Scotto)
 Joachim a Burck –  (Entirely new sacred songs) for six voices (Nuremberg: Dietrich Gerlach)
 Ippolito Chamaterò – Psalms for eight voices (Venice: Girolamo Scotto)
 Giovanni Matteo Faà di Bruno –  for five, six, and eight voices (Venice: Antonio Gardano, sons)
 Marc'Antonio Ingegneri – First book of masses for five and eight voices (Venice: Antonio Gardano, figliuoli)
 Paolo Isnardi – Masses for four voices (Venice: Antonio Gardano, figliuoli)
 Jacobus de Kerle
 for four, five, and six voices (Munich: Adam Berg)
Book of motets for four and five voices (Munich: Adam Berg), also includes a Te Deum for six voices
 Orlande de Lassus
, part 1 (Munich: Adam Berg), a collection of motets
 for six, seven, and twelve voices (Paris: Le Roy & Ballard)
 for four voices (Munich: Adam Berg), containing six pieces each in Latin, German, French, and Italian
 Claudio Merulo – First book of masses for five voices (Venice: sons of Antonio Gardano)
 Philippe de Monte – Second book of motets for five voices (Venice: Girolamo Scotto)
 Annibale Padovano – First book of masses for five voices (Venice: sons of Antonio Gardano)
 Giovanni Pierluigi da Palestrina – Third book of motets for five, six, and eight voices (Venice: Girolamo Scotto)
 Leonhard Päminger – two collections of motets published posthumously in Nuremberg by his sons
 Costanzo Porta – Third book of madrigals for five voices (Venice: sons of Antonio Gardano)
 Cipriano de Rore – Sacrae cantiones (pub. by Petrus Phalesius the Elder)

Births 

January 31
Ambrosius Metzger, German composer and Meistersinger
Giulio Cesare Monteverdi (baptized), Italian composer, younger brother of Claudio Monteverdi
February 22 – Gemignano Capilupi, Italian composer
July 19 (baptized) – Inigo Jones, English stage designer and architect (died 1652)
date unknown
Francesco Colombini, Italian composer and organist
Benedikt Faber, German composer
Juan de Palomares, Spanish composer and guitarist
Alessandro Striggio the younger, Italian composer
probable – Géry de Ghersem, Flemish composer and singer (died 1630)
 Cesarina Ricci de Tingoli, Italian composer.

Deaths 
March 15 (or earlier) – Christopher Tye, English composer (born c1505)
November 17 – Joannes Pionnier, French composer
December 7 – John Thorne, English composer and poet
December 27 – December 31 – Firmin Lebel, French chorus director and composer
date unknown
Johannes Claux, Flemish composer
Melchior Kreisstein, German music printer
Gislain Manilius, Flemish music printer
Petrus Phalesius the Elder, Flemish music publisher
probable – Alfonso dalla Viola, Italian composer and instrumentalist

 
Music
16th century in music
Music by year